Yuleba North is a rural locality in the Maranoa Region, Queensland, Australia.

History 
The locality takes its name from the town of Yeleba. When it was named in 1865, it was a settlement on Yuleba Creek. However, in October 1879 it moved to the railway crossing on Yuleba Creek.

Road infrastructure
The Warrego Highway runs along part of the southern boundary.

References 

Maranoa Region
Localities in Queensland